The Venezuelan Athletics Federation (FVA; Federación Venezolana de Atletismo) is the governing body for the sport of athletics in Venezuela.  Current president is Wilfredys León.  He took office in June 2010.

History 
FVA was founded in 1948.

Affiliations 
FVA is the national member federation for Venezuela in the following international organisations:
World Athletics
Confederación Sudamericana de Atletismo (CONSUDATLE; South American Athletics Confederation)
Association of Panamerican Athletics (APA)
Asociación Iberoamericana de Atletismo (AIA; Ibero-American Athletics Association)
Central American and Caribbean Athletic Confederation (CACAC)
Moreover, it is part of the following national organisations:
Venezuelan Olympic Committee (Spanish: Comité Olímpico Venezolano)

Members 

FVA comprises the 23 regional associations (plus capital district) of Venezuela.

National records 
FVA maintains the Venezuelan records in athletics.

References

External links
FVA official website

Venezuela
Athletics
Athletics in Venezuela
National governing bodies for athletics
Sports organizations established in 1948